Barry O'Sullivan is an Australian politician.

Barry O'Sullivan may also refer to:

Barry O'Sullivan (baseball), in 1968 College World Series
Barry O'Sullivan, character in Journey to the Seventh Planet

See also
Barry Sullivan (disambiguation)